The 1889–90 season is the 15th season of competitive football by Heart of Midlothian. Hearts competed in the Scottish Cup, the Rosebery Charity Cup and the East of Scotland Shield.

Overview

Results

Scottish Cup

East of Scotland Shield

Rosebery Charity Cup

See also
List of Heart of Midlothian F.C. seasons

References 

 Statistical Record 89-90

External links 
 Official Club website

Heart of Midlothian F.C. seasons
Hearts